Abraham Dukuly (born November 30, 2000) is a Ghanaian-Canadian soccer player who currently plays for South Bend Lions FC in USL League Two.

Career

Club
Dukuly signed a professional contract with North American Soccer League side FC Edmonton on August 28, 2017. Dukuly would spend one season with FC Edmonton, before the club ceased operations after the 2017 season.

Dukuly played college soccer for Northern Alberta Institute of Technology, where he was named the 2018 Alberta Colleges Athletic Conference Rookie of the Year.

Dukuly went on trial with Cavalry FC in spring 2020.

On April 1, 2021, Dukuly signed with USL League Two club South Bend Lions FC.

Personal life
Dukuly was born in Accra, Ghana before moving to Winnipeg, Manitoba, Canada as a child.

References

External links
FC Edmonton player profile
NAIT Ooks profile

2000 births
Living people
Association football midfielders
Canadian people of Ghanaian descent
FC Edmonton players
Ghanaian footballers
Naturalized citizens of Canada
North American Soccer League players
Soccer players from Winnipeg
Northern Alberta Institute of Technology alumni
Canadian expatriate soccer players
Expatriate soccer players in the United States
Canadian expatriate sportspeople in the United States
Canadian soccer players